Robert W. (Bob) Lockhart is a Canadian former politician, who served as mayor of Saint John, New Brunswick from 1971 to 1974 and again from 1980 to 1983.

Prior to his election to the mayoralty, Lockhart worked in media as a reporter, manager and proprietor of radio stations in the Saint John area, including CFBC and CFBC-FM.  He also served as a director of Broadcast News, and as a regional director of the Canadian Association of Broadcasters.

References

Mayors of Saint John, New Brunswick
Living people
Canadian radio executives
Canadian radio journalists
Year of birth missing (living people)